The Cebrenia quadrangle is one of a series of 30 quadrangle maps of Mars used by the United States Geological Survey (USGS) Astrogeology Research Program. The quadrangle is located in the northeastern portion of Mars’ eastern hemisphere and covers 120° to 180° east longitude (180° to 240° west longitude) and 30° to 65° north latitude. The quadrangle uses a Lambert conformal conic projection at a nominal scale of 1:5,000,000 (1:5M). The Cebrenia quadrangle is also referred to as MC-7 (Mars Chart-7).  It includes part of Utopia Planitia and Arcadia Planitia.
The quadrangle covers an approximate area of 4.9 million square km, or a little over 3% of Mars’ surface area.

Origin of name

Cebrenia is a telescopic albedo feature centered on 50° N and 150° E on Mars. The feature is named after Cebrenia, a country near ancient Troy. The name was approved by the International Astronomical Union (IAU) in 1958.

Physiography and geology
The quadrangle's prominent features are the large craters Mie and Stokes, a volcano, Hecates Tholus, and a group of mountains, Phlegra Montes.  This area is a flat, smooth plain for the most part, so the relatively large craters Mie and Stokes really stand out.  The Galaxias Region has an area of chaos, where the ground seems to have collapsed.

Viking II (part of Viking program) landed near Mie on September 3, 1976. Its landing coordinates were 48° N and 226° W.

Results from Viking II mission

What it would look like walking around the landing site 
The sky would be a light pink.  The dirt would also appear pink.  The surface would be uneven; the soil would be formed into troughs.  Large rocks would be spread about. Most of the rocks are similar in size.  Many of the rocks would have small holes or bubbles on their surfaces caused by gas escaping after the rocks came to the surface.  Some boulders would show erosion due to the wind.  Many rocks would appear to be perched, as if wind removed much of the soil at their bases.  In the winter snow or frost would cover most of the ground.  There would be many small sand dunes that are still active.  The wind speed would typically be 7 meters per second (16 miles per hour).  There would be a hard crust on the top of the soil similar to a deposit, called caliche which is common in the U.S. Southwest.  Such crusts are formed by solutions of minerals moving up through soil and evaporating at the surface.  Scientists, in a September, 2009 article in the journal Science, have asserted that if Viking II only dug four (4) inches deeper, it would have reached a layer of almost pure ice.

Analysis of soil 

The soil resembled those produced from the weathering of basaltic lavas.  The tested soil contained abundant silicon and iron, along with significant amounts of magnesium, aluminum, sulfur, calcium, and titanium.  Trace elements, strontium and yttrium, were detected.  The amount of potassium was 5 times lower than the average for the Earth's crust. Some chemicals in the soil contained sulfur and chlorine that were like typical compounds remaining after the evaporation of sea water. Sulfur was more concentrated in the crust on top of the soil then in the bulk soil beneath.  The sulfur may be present as sulfates of sodium, magnesium, calcium, or iron.  A sulfide of iron is also possible. The Spirit rover and the Opportunity rover both found sulfates on Mars.  Opportunity (landed in 2004 with advanced instruments) found magnesium sulfate and calcium sulfate at Meridiani Planum. Using results from the chemical measurements, mineral models suggest that the soil could be a mixture of about 90% iron-rich clay, about 10% magnesium sulfate (kieserite?), about 5% carbonate (calcite), and about 5% iron oxides (hematite, magnetite, goethite?).  These minerals are typical weathering products of mafic igneous rocks. Studies with magnets aboard the landers indicated that the soil is between 3 and 7 percent magnetic materials by weight.  The magnetic chemicals could be magnetite and maghemite.  These could come from the weathering of basalt rock.  Experiments carried out by the Mars Spirit Rover (landed in 2004) indicated that magnetite could explain the magnetic nature of the dust and soil on Mars.  Magnetite was found in the soil and that the most magnetic part of the soil was dark.  Magnetite is very dark.

Search for life 
Viking did three experiments to look for life.  The results were surprising and interesting.  Most scientists now believe that the data were due to inorganic chemical reactions of the soil, although a few scientists still believe the results were due to living reactions.  No organic chemicals were found in the soil.  However, dry areas of Antarctica do not have detectable organic compounds either, but they have organisms living in the rocks.  Mars has almost no ozone layer, like the Earth, so UV light sterilizes the surface and produces highly reactive chemicals such as peroxides that would oxidize any organic chemicals.  The Phoenix Lander discovered the chemical perchlorate in the Martian Soil. Perchlorate is a strong oxidant so it may have destroyed any organic matter on the surface. If it is widespread on Mars, carbon-based life would be difficult at the soil surface.
 
Research, published in the Journal of Geophysical Research in September 2010, proposed that organic compounds were actually present in the soil analyzed by both Viking 1 and 2. NASA's Phoenix lander in 2008 detected perchlorate which can break down organic compounds. The study's authors found that perchlorate will destroy organics when heated and will produce chloromethane and dichloromethane, the identical chlorine compounds discovered by both Viking landers when they performed the same tests on Mars. Because perchlorate would have broken down any Martian organics, the question of whether or not Viking found life is still wide open.

Ice exposed in new craters

Impressive research, reported in the journal Science in September 2009, has showed that some new craters on Mars show exposed, pure, water ice. After a time, the ice disappears, evaporating into the atmosphere. The ice is only a few feet deep. The ice was confirmed with the Compact Imaging Spectrometer (CRISM)] on board the Mars Reconnaissance Orbiter (MRO). The ice was found in a total of 5 locations. Three of the locations are in the Cebrenia quadrangle.
This discovery proves that future colonists on Mars will be able to obtain water from a wide variety of locations. The ice can be dug up, melted, then taken apart to provide fresh oxygen and hydrogen for rocket fuel. Hydrogen was the powerful fuel used by the Space Shuttle main engines.

Other craters
Impact craters generally have a rim with ejecta around them, in contrast volcanic craters usually do not have a rim or ejecta deposits.  Sometimes craters will display layers.  Since the collision that produces a crater is like a powerful explosion, rocks from deep underground are tossed onto the surface.  Hence, craters can show us what lies deep under the surface.

Hecates Tholus 

Recent research leads scientists to believe that Hecates Tholus erupted explosively about 350 million years ago, which is a not that long ago for Mars. The eruptions created depressions on the flanks of the volcano.  And just five million years ago, glacial deposits formed inside these depressions.  Some valleys on Hecates show a parallel drainage pattern.

Volcano-ice interactions 

Large amounts of water ice are believed to be present under the surface of Mars.  Some channels lie near volcanic areas.  When hot subsurface molten rock comes close to this ice, large amounts of liquid water and mud may be formed. Hrad Vallis in the Cebrenia quadrangle is close to Elysium Mons, a large volcano, which may have supplied water to create the channel.  Hrad Vallis is pictured below.

Galaxias region 

The ground in Galaxias seems to have collapsed.  Such land forms on Mars are called "Chaos terrain."  Galaxias Chaos is different from many other chaotic regions.  It does not have associated outflow channels, and it does not display a great elevation difference between it and the surrounding land area, as most of the other chaos regions.  Research by Pedersen and Head, published in 2010, suggests that Galaxias Chaos is the site of a volcanic flow that buried an ice-rich layer, called the Vastitas Borealis Formation (VBF).  It is generally believed that the VBF is a residue from water-rich materials deposited by large floods.   The VBF may have been of varied thickness and may have contained varied amounts of ice.  In the thin atmosphere of Mars, this layer would have slowly disappeared by sublimation (changing from a solid directly to a gas).  Since some areas would have sublimated more than others, the upper lava cap would not be supported evenly and would crack.  Cracks/troughs may have begun from sublimation and shrinkage along the edges of the lava cap.  Stress from the undermining of the cap edge would have made cracks in the cap. Places with cracks would undergo more sublimation, then the cracks would widen and form the blocky terrain characteristic of regions of chaos.  The sublimation process may have been aided by heat (geothermal flux) from magma movements.  There are volcanoes, namely Elysium Montes and Hecates Tholus, nearby which most likely are surrounded by dikes, which would have heated the ground.  Also, a warmer period in the past would have increased the amount of water sublimating from the ground.

Evidence of glaciers

Glaciers, loosely defined as patches of currently or recently flowing ice, are thought to be present across large but restricted areas of the modern Martian surface, and are inferred to have been more widely distributed at times in the past. Lobate convex features on the surface known as viscous flow features and lobate debris aprons, which show the characteristics of non-Newtonian flow, are now almost unanimously regarded as true glaciers. However, a variety of other features on the surface have also been interpreted as directly linked to flowing ice, such as fretted terrain, lineated valley fill, concentric crater fill, and arcuate ridges. A variety of surface textures seen in imagery of the midlatitudes and polar regions are also thought to be linked to sublimation of glacial ice.   
The pictures below show features that are probably associated with glaciers.

Channels

There is enormous evidence that water once flowed in river valleys on Mars.  Images of curved channels have been seen in images from Mars spacecraft dating back to the early seventies with the Mariner 9 orbiter.  Indeed, a study published in June 2017, calculated that the volume of water needed to carve all the channels on Mars was even larger than the proposed ocean that the planet may have had.  Water was probably recycled many times from the ocean to rainfall around Mars.

Pedestal craters

A pedestal crater is a crater with its ejecta sitting above the surrounding terrain and thereby forming a raised platform (like a pedestal). They form when an impact crater ejects material which forms an erosion-resistant layer, thus causing the immediate area to erode more slowly than the rest of the region. Some pedestals have been accurately measured to be hundreds of meters above the surrounding area. This means that hundreds of meters of material were eroded away. The result is that both the crater and its ejecta blanket stand above the surroundings. Pedestal craters were first observed during the Mariner missions.

Layered structures

Additional Images in Cebrenia quadrangle

Other Mars quadrangles

Interactive Mars map

See also 

 Climate of Mars
 Geology of Mars
 Glacier
 Glaciers on Mars
 HiRISE
 HiWish program
 Impact crater
 Latitude dependent mantle
 Lineated valley fill
 List of quadrangles on Mars
 List of mountains on Mars
 List of rocks on Mars 
 Martian chaos terrain
 Pedestal crater
 Vallis
 Volcanology of Mars
 Water on Mars

References

External links 

 
Mars